Horodnic may refer to one of two communes in Suceava County, Romania:

Horodnic de Jos
Horodnic de Sus